Ian Wright was a British illustrator.

Education and career
Born in England in 1953, Wright studied at Goldsmiths College in London (1974–1975) and received a bachelor's degree in graphic design from the London College of Printing in 1978. Following his degree studies, he became assistant to George Hardie (1978–1979) and then shared a studio with designer Neville Brody at The Face magazine (1979–1981 and 1990–1996). In 1981, he set up his own studio.

Wright's work as a commercial illustrator has spanned four decades, starting with his illustrative cover of The Undertones’ Teenage Kicks 7” single in the late 1970s, progressing with his illustrative artwork for The Face in their 1980s heyday and his weekly black and white portraits for the New Musical Express. His subsequent work has included projects for such famous, and diverse, names as Issey Miyake, Givenchy, Mike Tyson, Björk, Ian Brown, Pete Townshend, Tony Bennett, and T.I.

Wright has experimented with a variety of techniques. An early portrait of Grandmaster Flash was made entirely with salt to replicate cocaine as a reference to the seminal rap track "White Lines". He adopted photocopiers at an early stage, changing single color toners within the machine to mimic the screen print process by building layers of color from separate artworks into one final image. In his portraits and illustrative artwork for record sleeves and the music press, he combines analogue and digital techniques.

Wright’s illustrative artwork has been exhibited internationally, including in London at the Design Museum (2007), the Exposure Gallery (2007), the Cosh Gallery (2007), Rosemary Gardens (2005), and Pentagram Gallery (2005); in New York at the Reed Space (2006), Times Square (2006), Mass Production at The Christopher Henry Gallery (NYC) (2006), and Issey Miyake (2002); in Hong Kong at Agnes B Libarie Gallery (2007) and the Hong Kong Center Wanchai (2005); and in the Czech Republic at the 22nd International Biennale of Graphic Design (2006).

References

External links
Official website

1953 births
Living people
Alumni of Goldsmiths, University of London
English illustrators